Carlos Manuel de Céspedes y Quesada (August 12, 1871 – March 28, 1939) was a Cuban writer,  politician, diplomat, and President of Cuba.

Early life and career

He was the son of Carlos Manuel de Céspedes and Ana Maria de Quesada y Loinaz. He was also a distant cousin of Perucho Figueredo. In 1915, he married Laura Bertini y Alessandri, an Italian, first in Rome and then later again at City Hall in New York City by Mayor John Purroy Mitchel.  They had one child together, the daughter Alba de Céspedes.
He was educated first in New York City until 1885, when his mother took him and his twin sister to Germany.  He later earned degrees in international law and diplomacy from the Collège Stanislas in Paris, France.
In 1895, he returned to Cuba and from 1895 to 1898 he fought in the War of Independence, becoming a teniente coronel (lieutenant colonel) and the revolutionary post of governor of the Province of Santiago de Cuba.

Initial role in Cuban politics
He later entered Cuban politics and from 1902 to 1908, was vice president of the Cuban House of Representatives. Then in 1909, he joined the Cuban diplomatic service and represented his country as minister to Italy, and to Argentina, and as a special envoy to Greece. In 1914, he was Cuban Ambassador to the United States.
He returned to Cuba in 1922, to become Foreign Minister under Gerardo Machado but resigned after a year. President Machado then named him Ambassador to Mexico but Céspedes delayed his departure for reasons of ill health.

Presidency
Thereafter, he was active in trying to overthrow Machado. In August 1933, Machado left Cuba and Céspedes was offered the position of President. He took office on August 13, 1933.

Céspedes's Cabinet included Gobernación, Colonel Federico Laredo Bru, Union Nacionalista
Justicia, Dr. Carlos Saladrigas Zayas, A.B.C.
Hacienda, Dr. Joaquin Martinez Saenz, A.B.C.
Obras Públicas, Dr. Eduardo J. Chibas, Liberal
Agricultura, Dr. Rafael Santos Jimenez, Marianista
Instrucción Pública, Dr Guillermo Belt, Union Nacionalista
Sanidad y Beneficencia, Dr. Antonio Presno, University of Habana
Comunicaciones, Dr. Nicasio Silverior, O.C.R.R.
Guerra y Marina, Demetrio Castillo Pokorny, non-partisan
Presidencia, Dr. Raul de Cardenas y Echarte, Conservative

Already by August 19, 1933, Sumner Welles noted the increasing tension that remained within the Cuban army after Céspedes's assumption of the presidency. The reasons for the tensions within the army included that various officials of Machado's administration were allowed to leave the country, that high-ranking army officials who were part of Machado's administration still held their army positions, and that General Sanguily, the Army Chief of Staff, was still hospitalized. Welles noted the following on August 24, 1933:

Given those circumstances, Welles proposed that "general elections may be held approximately 3 months from now so that Cuba may once more have a constitutional government in the real sense of the word." Céspedes agreed, and on August 25, 1933, issued Presidential Decree 1298, which basically annulled the 1928 constitutional reforms and re-established the 1901 Constitution of Cuba in its entirety, terminated the presidential mandate of Machado,  dissolved the Cuban Congress,  vacated the seats of the Supreme Court of Cuba, and declared that a general election would be held on February 24, 1934, for a new presidential term to begin on May 20, 1934.
The decree was clearly intended to provide political stability and bring public confidence to Cespedes’ Administration. Despite its intention Cespedes’ Administration would only last for an additional 11 days from the date of its pronouncement. The decree stated as follows:

Despite those measures, on September 4–5, 1933, the Sergeants' Revolt took place while Céspedes was in Matanzas and Santa Clara after a hurricane had ravaged those regions. The hurricane having cost the lives of 200 people and property damages in the millions. Upon returning and reaching the presidential palace, Ramón Grau and members of the DEU or Directorio Estudiantil Universitario were awaiting him. "At 1 p.m. the Cespedes Cabinet resigned and President Cespedes left the Palace to go to his own house. Very little disorder took place. Immediately thereafter the Committee of five members (Pentarchy of 1933) of the revolutionary group took possession of the Palace as the executive power of the Cuban Republic."

Later life
He then returned to the Foreign Service and became the Cuban Ambassador to Spain.  
In 1935, he returned to Cuba and wrote several books including Carlos Manuel de Céspedes, Las Banderas de Yara y de Bayamo, and Manuel de Quesada y Loynáz.

He received numerous honors and awards including the Grand Cross of the Order of Carlos Manuel de Céspedes of Cuba, the Grand Cross of Belgium, the Grand Cross of Italy, the Grand Cross of Peru, the Grand Cross of the Spanish Republic, the Grand Ribbon of the Order of the Liberator of Venezuela, the Order of Merit (Chile)'', Commander of the National Order of the Legion of Honour of France, and of the Order of St. Lazaro and St. Maurice of Italy.

He died on March 28, 1939, in Vedado, Havana, of a heart attack and is buried at Cementerio de Cristóbal Colón in Havana.

References

 The Perucho Figueredo Page bio
  (Spanish)

External links
 

1871 births
1939 deaths
People from New York City
Cuban people of Spanish descent
Liberal Party of Cuba politicians
Presidents of Cuba
Cuban diplomats
Members of the Cuban House of Representatives
Government ministers of Cuba
Ambassadors of Cuba to the United States
Ambassadors of Cuba to Spain
Children of national leaders
1930s in Cuba
20th-century Cuban politicians
Commandeurs of the Légion d'honneur
Recipients of the Order of Saints Maurice and Lazarus